The Fox Broadcasting Company operates an American television network made up of 18 owned-and-operated stations and over 227 affiliates. This is a table listing of Fox affiliates, with Fox-owned stations separated from privately-owned affiliates, and arranged by market ranking based on data compiled by Nielsen Media Research. Eventually, there will be links to and articles on each of the stations, describing their local programming, hosts and technical information, such as broadcast frequencies.

The station's advertised channel number follows the call letters. In most cases, this is their PSIP virtual channel number, representing their pre-digital transition over-the-air frequency.

Owned-and-operated stations 

Stations are listed alphabetically by state and city of license. Owned-and-operated stations broadcasting on digital subchannels are italicized.

Notes:
1) Two boldface asterisks appearing following a station's call letters (**) indicate a station that was an original Fox-owned station from the network's inception in 1986;
2) Two boldface plus signs appearing following a stations call letters (++) indicate a station that was owned by New World Communications prior to its acquisition by News Corporation in 1997;
3) This list does not include Fox-owned stations affiliated with MyNetworkTV; a list is available under the article Fox Television Stations.

Affiliate stations

Fox channels outside the United States 
These channels use the Fox brand but do not necessarily air all of the same programmings as the U.S. network.

 Fox – cable television channel available in the UK and Ireland
 Fox8 (Australia) – a cable television channel available through the Foxtel cable service
 Fox Televizija (Serbia) – national coverage TV
 Fox Turkey (Turkey) – terrestrial commercial broadcaster in Turkey and Europe.
 Star Channel (Latin America) – cable television channel

See also
 List of Fox television affiliates (by U.S. state)
 List of former Fox television affiliates
 List of television stations in North America by media market

Footnotes

External links
 Official Fox list of affiliates

Fox